The Proscribed Royalist, 1651 (1852-1853) is a painting by John Everett Millais which depicts a young Puritan woman protecting a fleeing Royalist after the Battle of Worcester in 1651, the decisive defeat of Charles II by Oliver Cromwell. The Royalist is hiding in a hollow tree, a reference to a famous incident in which Charles himself hid in a tree to escape from his pursuers. Millais was also influenced by Vincenzo Bellini's 1835 opera I Puritani.

His friend and fellow painter, Arthur Hughes, served as the model for the Royalist.

Millais painted the picture in Hayes, Kent, from a local oak tree that became known as the Millais Oak.

See also
Proscription

Notes

Paintings by John Everett Millais
1853 paintings
Military art
English Civil War fiction